The Hawkesbury Guineas is a Hawkesbury Racing Club Group 3 Thoroughbred horse race for three-year-olds at set weights with penalties, over a distance of 1600 metres, held at Hawkesbury Racecourse in Clarendon, New South Wales, Australia.  Total prize money for the race is A$200,000.

History

Distance
 2000–2004 – 1200 metres
 2006 onwards - 1400 metres

Grade
 2000–2013 - Listed Race
 2014 onwards - Group 3

Conditions
 2000–2004 - Handicap
 2006 onwards - Set weights with penalties

Venue
 2015 - Rosehill Racecourse
 2020 - Rosehill Racecourse

Winners

 2022 - Mr Mozart  
 2021 - Exoboom  
 2020 - Dawn Passage  
 2019 - Military Zone  
 2018 - Sambro  
 2017 - Shazee Lee  
 2016 - Spill The Beans  
 2015 - ‡Najoom
 2014 - Chautauqua
 2013 - Limes
 2012 - Free Wheeling
 2011 - Pimpala Secret 
 2010 - Neeson 
 2009 - Related 
 2008 - Royal Discretion 
 2007 - Alverta 
 2006 - The Free Stater 
 2005 - †race not held
 2004 - Roadagain 
 2003 (Dec.) - Sweet Marmalade  
 2003 (Feb.) - Pearly Kings  
 2002 - Shags  
 2001 - De Valmont 
 2000 - Hire 

† Not held because of schedule change in racing calendar
 
‡ Race meeting abandoned after the first race on the card due to prolonged rain that affected the state of the track Race held the following week at Rosehill Racecourse.

See also
 List of Australian Group races
 Group races

References

Horse races in Australia